Martin Aku (September 2, 1913 in Lomé, Togo – June 17, 1970 in Lomé) was a Togolese politician who served in the French National Assembly from 1946–1951.

References 
 1st page on the French National Assembly website 
 2nd page on the French National Assembly website

1913 births
1970 deaths
People from Lomé
Togolese politicians
Deputies of the 1st National Assembly of the French Fourth Republic